Sanwa may refer to:

Places
Sanwa, Hiroshima, a former town in Hiroshima Prefecture
Miwa, Hiroshima, a former town in Hiroshima Prefecture (different romanization but same Japanese name)
Sanwa, Ibaraki, a town in Ibaraki Prefecture
Sanwa, Nagasaki, a former town in Nagasaki Prefecture
Sanwa, Niigata, a former village in Niigata Prefecture
 Sanwa, slang for "San Joaquin Valley", California

Companies
Sanwa Electric Instrument, A Japanese company manufacturing digital and analog multimeters and electrical measurement instruments
Sanwa Electronic, A Japanese company manufacturing radio-controlled model transmitters
Sanwa Bank, A Japanese bank now part of The Bank of Tokyo-Mitsubishi UFJ
Sanwa Group, A former keiretsu, or business group